Antiptilotis is a genus of snout moths. It was described by Edward Meyrick in 1897 and contains the species Antiptilotis rubicunda. It is found in Indonesia (Java and Sulawesi).

References

Tirathabini
Monotypic moth genera
Moths of Indonesia
Pyralidae genera